Frank Willis may refer to:
Frank B. Willis (1871–1928), American politician
Frank Willis (canoeist) (1915–1991), Canadian canoeist

See also
Francis Willis (disambiguation)